Eugene Marvin Collins (January 7, 1925 – February 9, 1998) was an American professional baseball pitcher and outfielder in the Negro leagues, minor leagues and in the Mexican League. He played from 1947 to 1961 with several teams, including the Omaha Rockets.

References

External links
 and Seamheads

1925 births
1998 deaths
Kansas City Monarchs players
Baseball players from Missouri
Sportspeople from Missouri
20th-century African-American sportspeople
Baseball pitchers